Larry Kindbom (born October 20, 1952) is a former American football and baseball coach. He served as the head football coach at Kenyon College in Gambier, Ohio from 1983 to 1988 and Washington University in St. Louis from 1989 to 2019, compiling a career college football coaching record of 220–149–1. Kindbom was also the head baseball coach at Kenyon from 1984 to 1988, tallying a mark of 35–118. He was a graduate assistant on the football staff at Ohio State University from 1977 to 1978 and an assistant football coach at the University of Akron from 1979 to 1982. On September 11, 2019, Kindbom announced his retirement following the 2019 season.

Head coaching record

Football

See also
 List of college football coaches with 200 wins

References

External links
 Washington University profile
 

1952 births
Living people
Akron Zips football coaches
Kalamazoo Hornets football players
Kenyon Lords baseball coaches
Kenyon Lords football coaches
Ohio State Buckeyes football coaches
Washington University Bears football coaches
Sportspeople from Lancaster, Pennsylvania
Players of American football from Pennsylvania